The Star Mine Suspension Bridge is a 117-metre-long pedestrian suspension bridge across the Red Deer River in Drumheller, Alberta, Canada. Constructed in 1931, it was built for the coal workers of Star Mine. In 1958, the Alberta government rebuilt (and currently maintains) the bridge to "commemorate part of the colourful mining history of the Drumheller Valley."

The bridge is now indefinitely closed to tourism.

See also 
 List of bridges in Canada

References 

Bridges in Alberta
Buildings and structures in Drumheller
1931 establishments in Alberta
Bridges completed in 1931